Elections to Portsmouth City Council were held on 1 May 2003.  One third of the council was up for election and the council stayed under no overall control. Overall turnout was 26.6%.

After the election, the composition of the council was:
Liberal Democrat 16
Conservative 15
Labour 11

Election result

Ward results

Baffins

Central Southsea

Charles Dickens

Copnor

Cosham

Drayton and Farlington

Eastney and Craneswater

Fratton

Hilsea

Milton

Nelson

Paulsgrove

St Jude

St Thomas

References
2003 Portsmouth election result
Full results
Ward turnouts 

2003
2003 English local elections
2000s in Hampshire